The International Federation of Textile Workers' Association (IFTWA) was a global union federation bringing together unions of textile workers, principally in Europe.

History
The federation's origins lay in the International Textile Congress, held in Manchester, in England, in 1894.  The congress was organised on the initiative of James Mawdsley and David Holmes, and of the 179,000 workers represented, 150,000 were covered by the British unions.  Other representatives came from Austria, Belgium, Denmark, France, the Netherlands, and the United States.  The European delegates pushed a more socialist approach, focusing on political action.  The congress agreed to establish an international organisation, and to campaign for a maximum eight-hour working day.

For the first few years, the federation did little beyond organise further conferences.  The European delegates argued unsuccessfully for the creation of an international strike fund, and successfully for the appointment of a general secretary to organise action.  William Marsland was appointed in 1905, and initially proved successful, learning French and publishing a quarterly newsletter.  However, his decision to publish an obituary for Edward VII proved highly controversial, and he stood down, to be replaced by Tom Shaw.

The organisation became inactive during World War I, but was re-established in 1920, and affiliated to the International Federation of Trade Unions.  Reductions in the working week were achieved over the next few years, and the federation agreed to establish a full-time secretariat, to be based in Manchester.  James Bell was appointed as general secretary, but after a year was replaced by Shaw.  Shaw was in government between 1929 and 1931, but continued on an unpaid basis, and then resumed the full-time position.

Under Shaw's leadership, the federation investigated working conditions in India and China, and made some limited efforts to encourage trade unionism in India.  An international 40-hour working week was agreed by the International Labour Organization, but never enacted, due to the outbreak of World War II.  After the war, James Stott led successful efforts to reconstruct the federation.

In 1960, the federation merged with the International Garment Workers' Federation, forming the International Textile and Garment Workers' Federation.

Affiliates
In 1954, the following unions were affiliated to the federation:

General Secretaries
1893: James Mawdsley
1895: Ferdinand Hardijns
1897: William Henry Wilkinson
1905: William Marsland
1911: Tom Shaw
1924: James Bell
1925: Tom Shaw
1938: Arthur Shaw (acting)
1939: James Stott
1949: Jack Greenhalgh

References

Global union federations
Textile and clothing trade unions
Trade unions established in 1894
Trade unions disestablished in 1960